Ramon Folch i Guillèn (*1946 in Barcelona) is a Catalan socio-ecologist.

Publications
L'energia en l'horitzó del 2030 (Energy towards 2030), 2005;
El territorio como sistema (The territory as system), 2003;
La dèria de mirar (The Craze for Looking), 2000;
Diccionario de Socioecología (Socio-ecology dictionary), 1999;
A four-volume series devoted to socio-ecology:
Sobre ecologismo y ecología aplicada (On ecologism and applied ecology), 1977;
Sobre ecología, educación y desarrollo (On ecology, education and development), 1990;
Sobre educación ambiental y socioecología (On environmental and socio-ecological education), 1993;
Ambiente, emoción y ética (Environment, emotion and ethics), 1998.

External links
Biographical sketch of Ramon Folch
Curriculum Vitae of Ramon Folch
"Inhabiting the World", an Innovative Look at Humans and their Environment, by Ramon Folch.

1946 births
Living people
Biologists from Catalonia
Environmentalists from Catalonia
Spanish ecologists
Academic staff of the University of Barcelona
Members of the Institute for Catalan Studies